Gabriel Karlsson Pears (born January 22, 1980) is a  former Swedish professional ice hockey player who last played for Leksands IF in the SHL.

External links 

Karlsson retires (Swedish)

1980 births
Swedish ice hockey centres
Swedish expatriate ice hockey players in Finland
Dallas Stars draft picks
HV71 players
Ässät players
Leksands IF players
Södertälje SK players
Skellefteå AIK players
Timrå IK players
Living people
People from Borlänge Municipality
Sportspeople from Dalarna County